José Marín Cañas (1904-1980) was born in San José, Costa Rica in 1904. His parents were Spanish, and he was educated in both Costa Rica and Spain. He worked in various occupations, most importantly journalism, which included his doing radio broadcasts of football matches. His literary career began in 1928, at which point he won prizes for both a short story and a chronicle. His literary output includes the novels El infierno verde, about the Chaco War between Bolivia and Paraguay, and Pedro Arnáez, which concerns El Salvador's Matanza, among other topics. He also served as director of the newspaper La Hora. He died in 1980.

Bibliography
 Lágrimas de acera (novel, 1929)
 Los bigardos del ron (short story, 1929)
 Como tú (theater, 1929)
 Tú, la imposible (novel, 1931)
 Coto (historical chronicle, 1934)
 El infierno verde (novel, 1935)
 Pueblo macho (essay, 1937)
 Pedro Arnáez (novel, 1942)
 Tierra de conejos (travel narrative, 1971)
 Ensayos (essay, 1972)
 Valses nobles y sentimentales (short story, 1981)

1904 births
1980 deaths
Costa Rican male writers
Costa Rican people of Spanish descent
People from San José, Costa Rica